LC or Lc may refer to:

Arts and entertainment

 Library of Congress Classification, a system of library classification

Gaming and play
 Lego Chess, a Lego-based chess video game
 Lego Creator, a theme of Lego
 Lego Creator (video game), a Lego video game
 Liberty City (Grand Theft Auto), a fictional city in the Grand Theft Auto computer and video game series

Music
 LC (album), 1981 album by The Durutti Column
 Lacuna Coil, an Italian gothic metal band
 Living Colour, an American hard rock band formed in New York
 Los Campesinos!, a British indie-rock band formed in Cardiff

In other media
 Licensed Companion, from the In Death novels of J.D. Robb (Nora Roberts)
 Shop LC, a 24/7 American shopping television channel

Businesses, organisations, and government agencies

Government agencies
 Irish Land Commission (or simply Land Commission), a rent fixing commission by the Land Law (Ireland) Act 1881
 Library of Congress, the de facto United States national library
 Liquor Control, including the Liquor Control Board of Ontario and the Manitoba Liquor Control Commission
 Local Council (Uganda), a form of local elected government within the districts of Uganda
 Technical Department of the Ministry of Aviation (Nazi Germany) in charge of research and development (LC, but more often referred to as C-amt)
 Lucknow-Kanpur Suburban Railway, a state-operated commuter rail service in the Kanpur-Lucknow region of India

Religious organizations
 Latin Catholic Church, or Roman Catholic Church
 Legion of Christ, a Roman Catholic religious order of priests
 Liberty Counsel, a legal organization dedicated to advancing specific religious freedoms

Schools
 Lafayette College, a private college in Easton, Pennsylvania, US
 Laguna College, a non-sectarian, private school in San Pablo City, Laguna
 Launceston College (Tasmania), a public senior-secondary school in Launceston, Tasmania, Australia
 Letran College in Manila, Philippines
 Lewis and Clark Community College, a community college in Godfrey, Illinois, US
 Lomagundi College, an independent, boarding school in Mashonaland West, Zimbabwe
 Loomis Chaffee, a coeducational boarding school in Windsor, Connecticut, US
 Lynchburg College, a private liberal arts college in Lynchburg, Virginia, US
 Lynden Christian Schools, a private school in Lynden, Washington, US

Other businesses and organizations
 Latvian Way, a political party of Latvia
 LC Perú, a Peruvian airline
 Lean Cuisine, a brand of microwaveable meals
 LendingClub, NYSE ticker symbol LC
 Lotta Continua, a former far-left extra-parliamentary organization in Italy
 Varig Logística (IATA airline designator LC)

Economics and finance
 Letter of credit, a document issued to provide a payment undertaking
 Local currency, also referred to as Local Currency Unit or LCU

People
 Lorne Cardinal, stage and television actor
 Leonora Carrington, Mexican painter/surrealist
 Liz Claiborne, fashion designer
 Les Claypool, bassist best known for his work with Primus
 Leonard Cohen, Canadian singer, songwriter, musician, poet, and novelist
 Laveranues Coles, New York Jets wide receiver
 Lauren Conrad, fashion designer and former reality TV star on The Hills and Laguna Beach
 Le Corbusier, architect, and a series of furniture designed by same

Places
 Las Cruces, New Mexico, US
 LC, Swansea, a Leisure Centre in Wales
 Leicester, a city in the United Kingdom
 Lewis Center, Ohio, United States
 Little Compton, Rhode Island, US
 Lučenec, a town in Slovakia
 Saint Lucia, ISO 3166-1 country code

Science and technology

Biology and medicine
 × Laeliocattleya, a genus of orchids
 Langerhans cell, a tissue-resident macrophage
 Lethal concentration, a means to quantitatively indicate a gas or aerosol hazard
 Lignocellulose
 Locus coeruleus, a noradrenergic nucleus in the brain stem
 Long COVID, a term for aftereffects occurring after recovering from and presumed to be caused by COVID-19

Ecology
 Least Concern, a World Conservation Union "Red List of Threatened Species" category

Electronics and computing
 .lc, the country code top level domain (ccTLD) for Saint Lucia
 Macintosh LC family, a range of personal computers manufactured by Apple in the early 1990s
 Macintosh LC, the first computer in the Macintosh LC family
 LC-type optical fiber connector
 LC circuit, in electronics, a circuit with an inductor and a capacitor
 Linear cryptanalysis, a form of cryptanalysis 
 Lines of Code
 Logic cell, in Field-programmable gate arrays

Vehicles
 Toyota Land Cruiser, an SUV built by Toyota Motor Corporation
 Lexus LC, a grand tourer built by Toyota Motor Corporation
 Geely LC, a hatchback car
 Landing craft, used to convey infantry and vehicles to shore in an amphibious assault

Other uses in science and technology
 Launch Complex, a rocket launch site
 Leading coefficient, in mathematics
 Leeuwin Current, a warm ocean current
 Liquid chromatography, an analytical chemistry technique
 Liquid crystal, a phase of matter with properties between a solid and a liquid state, commonly used in displays

Other uses 
 Law corporation, a special type of limited liability corporation available for single attorneys in California
 Leaving Certificate, the final course in the Irish secondary school system
 Letter case, used in orthography and typography to denote the difference between capital and non-capital letters
 Lower case lettering
 Level crossing, on some maps, an intersection of a railway line and road at the same level
 Loc. cit. (loco citato), in citations, used to repeat a citation, including the page to which the citation refers
 Long course, an Olympic-size swimming pool
 Lord Chancellor, a senior functionary in the government of the United Kingdom

See also

 LCLC (disambiguation)
 LCC (disambiguation)
 LCS (disambiguation)
 LLC (disambiguation)